The Lincoln Metropolitan Statistical Area, as defined by the United States Census Bureau, is an area consisting of two counties in Nebraska, anchored by the city of Lincoln. As of the 2020 census, the MSA had a population of 340,217 .

Counties
Lancaster
Seward

Communities

Places with more than 250,000 inhabitants
Lincoln – 258,379 inhabitants (Principal City)

Places with 1,000 to 10,000 inhabitants
Hickman – 2,264 inhabitants
Milford – 2,210 inhabitants
Seward – 6,964 inhabitants
Waverly – 3,277 inhabitants

Places with 500 to 1,000 inhabitants
Bennet – 570 inhabitants
Firth – 564 inhabitants
Utica – 844 inhabitants
Walton – 561 inhabitants

Places with 250 to 500 inhabitants
Hallam – 276 inhabitants
Malcolm – 413 inhabitants
Panama – 253 inhabitants
Staplehurst – 270 inhabitants

Places with fewer than 250 inhabitants
Bee – 223 inhabitants
Cordova – 127 inhabitants
Davey – 153 inhabitants
Denton – 189 inhabitants
Garland – 247 inhabitants
Goehner – 186 inhabitants
Pleasant Dale – 245 inhabitants
Raymond – 186 inhabitants
Roca – 220 inhabitants
Sprague – 146 inhabitants

Demographics

As of the census of 2000, there were 266,787 people, 105,200 households, and 64,917 families residing within the MSA. The racial makeup of the MSA was 90.56% White, 2.66% African American, 0.61% Native American, 2.70% Asian, 0.06% Pacific Islander, 1.61% from other races, and 1.80% from two or more races. Hispanic or Latino of any race were 3.23% of the population.

The median income for a household in the MSA was $42,275, and the median income for a family was $52,745. Males had a median income of $33,469 versus $23,972 for females. The per capita income for the MSA was $19,822.

See also
Nebraska census statistical areas

References

 
Lancaster County, Nebraska
Seward County, Nebraska
Metropolitan areas of Nebraska